Hot Zex is a shoegaze band from Novosibirsk, Russia. Original name of the band was Hot Zecks but it was shortened later. The band consists of Vladimir Komarov on vocals and guitar, Anton Zenkov on bass and Konstantin Nikonov on drums.

Discography

Albums 
 1995 — Sugababes (CC, own release, Russia)
 1997 — Velvety/Dual (CC, Hit Service, Russia)
 2003 — 7 lovesongs and a track about daily routine of an airport (CD, Chelsea Girl Records, Japan)
 2009 — Standby (Digital, Northern Star Records, Great Britain & AeroCCCP Recordings, USA)

7" 
 2006 — Hot Zex «Cold Sunday Rain» / Dayplanener «Sunshine» (Split single, MPLS LTD, USA)
 2009 — MPLS LTD V/A (East Side track 2: Hot Zex «Made of Dirt»)

Compilations 
 2001 — Seven Winters (CD, G.A.C., Japan)
 2004 — Pop Renaissance (CD, Excellent Records, Japan)
 2007 — Avant 2007 (CD, Avant Recordings, Russia)
 2007 — Alley PM V2.0 (CD, Alley P.M., Russia)
 2008 — Future Sound of Russia (CD, AeroCCCP Recordings, USA)
 2009 — Future Sound of Russia 2 (CD, AeroCCCP Recordings, USA)

External links
 Hot Zex's page on Myspace
 Hot Zex's page on Discogs

Musical groups established in 1995
Russian rock music groups
Russian musical trios
Musical groups from Novosibirsk